Senator Youmans may refer to:

Clarion A. Youmans (1847–1906), Wisconsin State Senate
Henry M. Youmans (1832–1920), Michigan State Senate